Periyatambiran was a king found in non-Agam village deities, In the eastern part of Sri Lanka, the worship of Periyathambiran is widespread. One of the 17 prisoners who settled in Batticaloa,Worshiped as the deity of the Vannars

References 

Sri Lankan Tamil history
Tamil monarchs
Sri Lankan Hindus